The Warrington Wolves–Wigan Warriors rivalry is a local rugby league rivalry based in Lancashire, England. The two clubs are some of the most successful in England, and annually compete in the Locker Cup to celebrate their rivalry.

History

The competitive history of the two clubs began on 18 January 1873 when the then two month old Wigan Warriors played their first match against Warrington Wolves (who would not form an official team for another three years). Both clubs were founding members of the NRFU, and have enjoyed a fierce rivalry throughout their history. Both sides also have other major rivalries, Warrington vs Widnes Vikings and Wigan vs St Helens, which at times has dampened the rivalry between them. However it's was Wigan's dominance in during the late 80s and 90s which caused the largest taming of the rivalry. It's was only in 2009 and 2010 following Warrington's back to back victory in the Challenge Cup and the club's subsequently establishing themselves as a Super League Top Four Club which saw the rivalry heat up again as both teams started simultaneously competing for top honours. In the decade that followed, the clubs contested three Super League Grand Finals in 2013, 2016, and 2018. The rivalry has said to have been at its peak between 2011 and 2013.

Head to head
Statistics correct as of 19/8/22
 
In all competitions, competitive and uncompetitive:

Meetings in major finals
1925–26 NFRL Division One Championship Final: Wigan 22–10 Warrington
1948–49 Lancashire Cup Final: Wigan 14–8 Warrington
1950–51 Lancashire Cup Final: Wigan 28–5 Warrington
1989–90 Challenge Cup Final: Wigan 36–14 Warrington
1985–86 Lancashire Cup Final: Wigan 34–8 Warrington
1986–87 Premiership Final: Wigan 8–0 Warrington
1987–88 Lancashire Cup Final: Wigan 28–16 Warrington
2013 Super League Grand Final: Wigan 30–16 Warrington
2016 Super League Grand Final: Wigan 12–6 Warrington
2018 Super League Grand Final: Wigan 12–4 Warrington

Collective honours
As of the 2022 Challenge Cup Final

Locker Cup

The Locker Cup (previously the Wardonia Cup until 1972) is a friendly tournament contested by rugby league clubs Warrington Wolves and Wigan Warriors introduced in 1938. The single game tournament was played as a preseason friendly alternating between the club's home grounds annually until the switch to summer rugby in 1996. Since then, the cup has been contest for only twice, once at Magic Weekend 2019 and during a competitive game during the 2022 season.

Results

See also
Derbies in the Rugby Football League

References

Warrington Wolves
Wigan Warriors
Rugby league rivalries
Sports rivalries in the United Kingdom